Following the killing of Armenian journalist Hrant Dink in Istanbul on 19 January 2007 various lists of journalists killed in Turkey since the early 20th century were published. One such list was published by the Turkish Association of Journalists (tr: Türkiye Gazteciler Cemiyeti). It contains 68 names of journalists killed between 1909 and 2022. A "Platform of imprisoned journalists" published a list in April 2012 that contained 112 names. Yet, it is difficult to obtain detailed information in particular on early cases, in order to determine whether the deaths had been assassinations directly linked to the profession of the victims.

It also appears that some people were not journalists by profession, but affiliated to certain publications as readers, vendors or even part-time publishers of political comments. These people will not be included in the lists, apart from people who were killed because they distributed certain publications.

In some cases, the state has been seen guilty for assassinating Kurdish journalists.

Killings until September 1980
Only few cases of journalists killed in Turkey between the foundation of the Republic and the military coup of 12 September 1980 were listed. Yet, some of these killings were high-profile assassinations that contributed to the atmosphere of political violence (often termed "civil war") that the Turkish army used as the main reason for its intervention. A bit more information is available on some of the 15 cases reported for this period:
{| class = wikitable
! Name!!Publication!!Place!!Date!!Remarks
|-
| Hikmet Şevket||||||1930||
|-
| Sabahattin Ali|| Marko Paşa|| Edirne|| 2 April 1948||listed under writers
|-
| Hüseyin Şen||KAWA||Istanbul||21 March 1978||He was the editor-in-chief of the journal and member of a Kurdish newspaper. He was allegedly tortured and killed in Selimiye (Istanbul) military prison.
|-
| Gani Bozarslan|| Aydınlık||||10 May 1978||Translated books from Kurdish to Turkish
|-
| Ali İhsan Özgür||Politika||Istanbul||21 November 1978||Politika was first issued by DİSK and later by the TKP. Ali İhsan Özgür disappeared so that the family had difficulties in identifying him.
|-
| Cengiz Polatkan|| Hafta Sonu|| Ankara||1 December 1978||
|-
| Abdi İpekçi|| Milliyet|| Istanbul||1 February 1979||Two members of the ultra-nationalist Grey Wolves, Oral Çelik and Mehmet Ali Ağca (who later shot pope John Paul II), murdered Abdi İpekçi in his car on the way back home from his office in front of his apartment building in Istanbul. Ağca was caught due to an informant and was sentenced to life in prison. After serving six months in a military prison in Istanbul, Ağca escaped with the help of military officer.
|-
| İlhan Darendelioğlu||Ortadoğu|| Istanbul||19 November 1979||Member of the MHP, see :tr:İlhan Egemen Darendelioğlu
|-
| İsmail Gerçeksöz||Ortadoğu||Istanbul||4 April 1980||Also published books
|-
| Hayrabet Honca|| Halkın Birliği|| Kayseri||1 May 1980||Member of TKP/ML Hareketi, killed by right-wingers
|-
| Ümit Kaftancıoğlu|| TRT|| Istanbul|| 11 April 1980||Right-wing Ahmet Mustafa Kıvılcım stated in his interrogation by the police that he killed Ümit Kaftancıoğlu, because he was a "leftist", but later rejected the statement. He remained four months in pre-trial detention and was released. The assailants were not found.
|-
| Muzaffer Fevzioğlu|| Hizmet|| Trabzon|| 15 April 1980||
|-
| Recai Ünal||Demokrat||Istanbul||22 July 1980||Allegedly kidnapped and tortured
|}

Killings in the 1980s and 1990s with laicist journalists as targets

After the military coup of 1980 fewer journalists were killed in the fight between the radical left and the extreme right. After the end of the 1980s there have been several killings of journalists known for their anti-government attitude and secular (in Turkey also termed laicist). In some cases members of radical Islamic organizations have been prosecuted and condemned for these killings. In one case a militant of the PKK allegedly confessed to such a killing. Other killings in the 1980s and 1990s include:
{| class="wikitable"
!Name!!Publication!!Place!!Date!!Remarks
|-
| Mevlüt Işıt||Türkiye||Ankara ||1 June 1988||
|-
| Kamil Başaran||Gazete||İstanbul ||28 February 1989||Shot by the owner of a restaurant, who did not like his way of reporting.
|-
| Seracettin Müftüoğlu||Hürriyet||Nusaybin||29 June 1989||
|-
| Sami Başaran||Gazete||İstanbul ||7 November 1989||He had an interview with the leader of a Kurdish tribe from Mardin in his office in Aksaray (Istanbul), where he was shot
|-
| Çetin Emeç||Hürriyet||İstanbul ||7 March 1990||Two people entered his car and shot him and his driver Sinan Ercan. Four members of the Islamic Movement Organization (tr: İslami Hareket Örgütü were sentenced to life imprisonment, but his brother does not believe that the true killers were caught.
|-
| Turan Dursun||2000'e Doğru||İstanbul ||4 September 1990||A member of the Islamic Movement Organization (tr: İslami Hareket Örgütü was sentenced to life imprisonment, but the person believed to be his killer remains free.
|-
| Uğur Mumcu||Cumhuriyet||Ankara ||24 January 1993||While different hypothesis exist on who was behind the killing the prosecutor's office in Ankara maintains that two assassins were sentenced and a case opened against the third suspect, all three of them being members of the Tawhid-Salaam Jerusalem Organization (tr: Tevhid-Selam Kudüs) that was allegedly behind the murder.
|-
| Onat Kutlar||Cumhuriyet||İstanbul||11 January 1995||The brother of the archaeologist Yasemin Cebenoyan, who had died in the same bomb attack, complained that many people thought the murder had not been solved or that an Islamic organization was behind it. He was convicted in 2005, but as a confessor was released after 9.5 years' imprisonment. The attack was later revealed to be carried out by PKK.
|-
| Ahmet Taner Kışlalı ||Cumhuriyet||Ankara ||21 October 1999||His death as well as the killings of Uğur Mumcu, Prof. Dr. Ahmet Taner Kışlalı, Prof. Dr. Muammer Aksoy and Assistant Professor Dr. Bahriye Üçok were the subject of a trial at Ankara Heavy Penal Court 11 known as the Umut (Hope) case. The court ruled that the defendants had formed an illegal organization by the name of "Kudüs Ordusu" (Jerusalem Army) and "Tevhid Selam" (Tawhid-Salaam) and had committed violent acts in Turkey. On 28 July 2005 one defendant was sentenced to life imprisonment, while seven others received sentences as leaders or members of an illegal organization. The Court of Cassation confirmed the sentence of the main suspect on 11 November 2006.
|}

Journalists and vendors killed in the Kurdish-Turkish conflict
In the 1990s the Kurdish-Turkish conflict became harsher with a large number of casualties on both sides. At the same time more and more civilians fell victim to extrajudicial killings, murders by unknown assailants (tr: faili meçhul), a term used in Turkish to indicate that the perpetrators were not identified because of them being protected by the State and cases of disappearance. Soon after the pro-Kurdish press had started to publish the first daily newspaper by the name of "Özgür Gündem" (Free Agenda) killings of Kurdish journalists started. In many cases, the state was blamed for murders and in some cases the Turkish variety of the radical Islamic organization Hizbullah was made responsible for the killings, in others the PKK was accused, but the majority remained without a clear indication to the persons behind the fatal attacks. Hardly any of them has been clarified or resulted in sanctions for the assailants. Among the 33 journalists that were killed in the first half of the 1990s are also cases not related to the Kurdish conflict. In 2008, the European Court of Human Right condemned Turkey for executing and assassinating Kurdish journalists and writers. Musa Anter, a prominent Kurdish writer, was killed by JİTEM in 1992.

Among Kurdish patriots (tr: yurtsever, often used as an acronym for sympathizers of the PKK by the state) the "tradition" that started with Özgür Gündem is often called "history of the free press". In this context the figure of 76 victims (called martyrs of the press; tr: basın şehitleri) is often mentioned. In 2008, the ECHR has condemned Turkey for assassinating Musa Anter who was working for Özgur Gundem.

Yet, the number of staff members of the "free press" and volunteers to distribute dailies and weeklies termed "Kurdish free press" that were killed "on duty", particularly during the early stages of reporting on the Kurdish question in Turkey remains high. The list of names of distributors of Özgür Gündem and its successors that were killed (while the perpetrators mostly remained unknown) includes 18 names. Among the 33 journalists that were killed between 1990 and 1995 most were working for the so-called Kurdish Free Press.

{| class = "wikitable"
! Name!!Publication!!Place!!Date!!Remarks
|-
| Gündüz Etil ||Yeni Günaydın||İstanbul||18 September 1991||
|-
| Halit Güngen||2000'e Doğru||Diyarbakır ||18 February 1992||Killed by unidentified persons two days after reporting that eyewitnesses and sympathizers of Turkish Hezbollah had said that members of the organization were educated in the headquarters of Turkey's rapid deployment force (Çevik Kuvvet) in Diyarbakır.
|-
| Cengiz Altun||Yeni Ülke||Batman ||25 February 1992||Killed by six bullets fired into his back as he was on his way to work.
|-
| İzzet Kezer||Sabah||Cizre, Şırnak Province||23 March 1992||A journalist for the mainstream daily, Sabah; shot and killed by security forces during violence that followed the celebration of the Kurdish New Year. During a state-imposed curfew, Kezer and other journalists emerged from their hotel waving white flags. No shooting was going on at the time. Kezer, at the head of the group, reached an intersection and was shot dead by security forces who fired from an armored personnel carrier. No action was taken against the security forces responsible for his death.
|-
| Bülent Ülkü||Körfeze Bakış||Bursa ||1 April 1992||Found wounded near Uludağ on 1 April and died shortly afterwards. The autopsy certified marks of handcuffs and ink on his fingers. Officials claimed that he was the victims of an internal dispute between left-wing organizations, but friends denied this.
|-
| Mecit Akgün||2000e Doğru||Nusaybin, Mardin||2 June 1992||His body was found hanging from a telephone pole near the village of Colova in Nusaybin. It was claimed that a statement was found on his body saying that he was "punished because he was a traitor", this was allegedly signed by the PKK.
|-
| Hafız Akdemir||Özgür Gündem||Diyarbakır ||8 June 1992||Killed by a single bullet into the back of his head, fifty meters from his home in Diyarbakir. Özgür Gündem began publication on 30 May 1992; reporters stated that they had received telephoned threats for several days, several addressed to Akdemir. He had written about the Islamic organization Hezbollah and Turkish counterguerrillas.
|-
| Çetin Ababay ||Özgür Halk||Batman||29 July 1992||Shot in the head by three unidentified men while on his way home in Batman.
|-
| Yahya Orhan||Özgür Gündem||Gercüş, Batman Province||31 July 1992||Shot and killed by unknown assailants. Özgür Gündem reported that he had been stopped on the street and threatened.
|-
| Hüseyin Deniz||Özgür Gündem||Ceylanpınar, Şanlıurfa Province||9 August 1992||Critically wounded by a bullet fired into his neck. He was also the regional correspondent for the daily, Cumhuriyet.
|-
| Musa Anter||Özgür Gündem ||Diyarbakır ||20 September 1992||He had written for Özgür Gündem  and Yeni Ulke, as well as for the Kurdish newspaper Welat. He was also the chairman of the board of the Mesopotamian Cultural Center in Istanbul. He was reportedly lured from his hotel on false pretenses and shot in the outskirts of Diyarbakir. A relative accompanying him was shot and wounded at the same time.
|-
| Mehmet Sait Erten||Azadi-Denk ||Diyarbakır ||3 November 1992||
|-
| Yaşar Aktay||free-lanced||Hani, Diyarbakır ||9 November 1992||Killed during clashes between the PKK militants and government forces.
|-
| Hatip Kapçak||Serbest/Hürriyet||Mazıdağı, Mardin ||18 November 1992||Mardin reporter for a local newspaper, Soz, and for the weekly journal, Gercek (Fact). Killed in an armed attack in the Mazidagi district of Mardin on 18 November. He had been researching and reporting on the activities of the Turkish Hezbollah organization, which allegedly has ties to security forces. He had served six years in prison on political charges following the 1980 military coup. After his release, he wrote for the mainstream daily, Gunes, and then for the daily, Hurriyet.
|-
| Namık Tarancı ||Gerçek||Diyarbakır ||20 November 1992||Shot and killed on his way to work. He reportedly received three bullets in his head after an attack by two assailants and died on the spot.
|-
| Kemal Kılıç||Yeni Ülke||Şanlıurfa ||18 February 1993||Shot dead with two bullets in the head by four assailants. He had been writing for the newspaper Yeni Ulke since the suspension of publication of Özgür Gündem in January. He was also a member of the board of the Urfa Branch of the Turkish Human Rights Association. Mehmet Senol, the Diyarbakir representative for Özgür Gündem, reported that Kilic had applied for a gun license, but that his application had been rejected. He was shot and killed by unknown assailants in Kulunce Village, near Sanliurfa. Police had questioned him about a news release he had published on the difficulties distributors had faced in selling the newspaper in Sanliurfa Province.
|-
| Mehmet İhsan Karakuş||Silvan Gazetesi||Silvan, Diyarbakır  ||13 March 1993||Owner of the local newspaper Silvan. Shot by unknown assailants that were not identified until the end of 1993.
|-
| Ercan Gürel||Hürriyet News Agency||Bergama, Izmir Province||20 May 1993||Veysel Özakıncı was detained as his killer and stated that he killed him because of a dispute of the ownership of land.
|-
| Ömer Taşar||Milli Gazete||Sarajevo||26 June 1993||Killed by fire opened from Serbian positions while covering the Bosnian Civil War.
|-
| İhsan Uygur||Sabah||İstanbul||6 July 1993||
|-
| Rıza Güneşer||Halkın Gücü||İstanbul||14 July 1993||Owner of the left-wing journal "Halkın Gücü". The murder is believed to have been committed by the "Bedri Yağan group", a split of the Devrimci Sol
|-
| Ferhat Tepe||Özgür Gündem||Bitlis ||28 July 1993|| Disappeared when he was reportedly forced to get into a car. Although several teams of police were seen patrolling the streets at the time, they denied any knowledge of the incident. On 8 August a body found in Lake Hazar, near Elazığ, was identified as being Tepe's. On 9 May 2003 the European Court of Human Rights ruled that the material in the case file does not enable it to conclude beyond all reasonable doubt that the applicant's son was abducted and killed by any State agent or person acting on behalf of the State authorities.
|-
| Muzaffer Akkuş||Milliyet||Bingöl||20 September 1993||Killed by unknown assailants.
|-
| Ruhi Can Tul||TDN||Kırıkkale||14 January 1994||Died when a bomb exploded in a bus going from Ankara to Samsun. Three others were killed. The PKK allegedly claimed responsibility for the attack.
|-
| Nazım Babaoğlu||Gündem||Siverek, Şanlıurfa Province||12 March 1994||Presumed dead after disappearing in Siverek, a small town near Sanliurfa. He had traveled there to follow up on a news tip from a colleague, who later denied phoning him.
|-
| Kamil Koşapınar||Zaman||Erzurum||19 March 1994||According to the newspaper he worked for, he was killed by a stray bullet at a photo shop.
|-
| İsmail Ağay||Özgür Ülke|| Batman||29 May 1994||Surname might be Ağaya; according to the Bar Association in Batman he is "missing" since December 1994.
|-
| Erol Akgün||Devrimci Çözüm||Gebze, Kocaeli Province||8 September 1994||Editor-in-chief of the left-wing weekly Devrimci Cozum. Killed by unidentified assailants as he left his home in Gebze, near Istanbul. His colleagues at the paper believe a rival left-wing faction killed him because he was the weekly's editor.
|-
| Bahri Işık||Çağdaş Marmara||İstanbul||17 September 1994||
|-
| Ersin Yıldız||Özgür Ülke||İstanbul||3 December 1994||Died when the offices of his paper in Istanbul were destroyed by a bomb, planted by unidentified persons, 19 staff members were wounded.
|-
| Bekir Kutmangil||Yeni Günaydın||İstanbul||23 May 1995||Owner of the local newspaper, but was reportedly involved in affairs of organized crime. A rival was made responsible for the killing.
|-
| Nail Aydın||Son Haber||Giresun||28 July 1995||
|-
| Seyfettin Tepe||Yeni Politika||Bitlis||28 August 1995||Also spelled Safyettin Tepe, was taken into custody on 22 August. Four days later he was moved to the Bitlis Security Directorate. He died in custody on 29 August. His family was told that he committed suicide but rejects that official explanation.
|}

At the same time several people distributing pro-Kurdish newspaper in the region under a state of emergency, were also killed.

Killings of journalists since 1995
The killings of journalists in Turkey since 1995 are more or less individual cases. Most prominent among the victims is Hrant Dink, killed in 2007, but the death of Metin Göktepe also raised great concern, since police officers beat him to death. Since 2014, several Syrian journalists who were working from Turkey and reporting on the rise of Daesh have been assassinated.

The death of Metin Alataş in 2010 is also a source of disagreement – while the autopsy claimed it was suicide, his family and colleagues demanded an investigation. He had formerly received death threats and had been violently assaulted.

See also
 Human Rights in Turkey
 Censorship in Turkey
 List of assassinated people from Turkey
 List of arrested journalists in Turkey
 List of journalists killed in Europe

References

Killed
 
People murdered in Turkey
Turkey crime-related lists
Turkey